Aporrhais senegalensis is a species of medium-sized sea snail, a marine gastropod mollusc in the family Aporrhaidae, the pelican's foot snails or pelican's foot shells.

Description

Distribution

References

External links

Aporrhaidae
Molluscs of the Atlantic Ocean
Invertebrates of West Africa
Taxa named by John Edward Gray
Gastropods described in 1838